Patrick Donald Leahy (born June 9, 1979 in Brighton, Massachusetts) is a former professional ice hockey right wing who played in the National Hockey League (NHL) with the Boston Bruins and the Nashville Predators before spending the rest of career abroad with EHC Black Wings Linz of the Austrian Hockey League.

Playing career
Leahy originally played hockey at Boston College High School of the Catholic High School Conference. During his time at BC High, Leahy set a school record for points in career (with 140), was named to the Boston Globe and Boston Herald Dream Teams as a senior, and was honored with the titles of team captain and MVP.

After being drafted in the 5th round, 122nd overall, at the 1998 NHL Entry Draft by the New York Rangers, Leahy spent 4 years playing college hockey for Miami University in Oxford, Ohio before he turned pro in 2001.  During his first year of professional hockey, Leahy played for four pro teams, including the Trenton Titans of the ECHL, the Hershey Bears, the Portland Pirates and the Bridgeport Sound Tigers of the American Hockey League.  After bouncing around during the 2001–02 season, Leahy settled with the Providence Bruins for the entire 2002–03 season before signing with NHL affiliate, the Boston Bruins the following season on July 28, 2003.

During the 2003–04, Leahy made his NHL debut with the Bruins against the Philadelphia Flyers on December 6, 2003. After 6 scoreless games with Boston he was returned to the P-Bruins. Remaining with Providence through the 2004 NHL Lockout, Pat made the Bruins opening roster for the 2005–06 season and on October 8, 2005, he scored his first NHL goal (unassisted) against the Pittsburgh Penguins. In 43 games with Boston he scored 4 goals for 8 points before reassigned to Providence.

On July 17, 2006, Leahy left the Bruins organization and signed a one-year contract as a free agent with the Nashville Predators. Making just a single appearance with the Predators during the 2006–07 season, Leahy was assigned to AHL affiliate, the Milwaukee Admirals of the majority of the year.

Unable to establish a NHL spot after six professional seasons, Leahy signed with European team EHC Black Wings Linz of the Austrian Hockey League. Leahy spent the last 7 seasons of his career with Linz, culminating with a Championship in 2012 before retiring at the end of the 2013–14 season.

Career statistics

References

External links
 

1979 births
Living people
American men's ice hockey right wingers
Boston Bruins players
Boston College High School alumni
Bridgeport Sound Tigers players
EHC Black Wings Linz players
Hershey Bears players
Miami RedHawks men's ice hockey players
Milwaukee Admirals players
Nashville Predators players
New York Rangers draft picks
Portland Pirates players
Providence Bruins players
Trenton Titans players
Ice hockey people from Boston